Pontécoulant is a prominent lunar impact crater that is located in the southeastern part of the Moon. Due to its position, the crater appears foreshortened from the Earth and it is difficult to observe much detail. Nearby craters include Hanno just to the northeast, and the comparably sized Helmholtz due south.

This crater has terraced inner wall that is nearly circular, but with an outward extension to the southeast. The rim is somewhat worn but retains much detail. The crater partly overlies the older and smaller Pontécoulant E along the southern rim, and has several tiny craterlets on the eastern inner wall and one to the southwest.

The inner floor is nearly flat, with some rough ground near the southern rim and some low central peaks located southwest of the midpoint. There is a small but prominent crater located at the center of the floor, and several other tiny craterlets scattered across the inner surface.

The eponym of this crater is Philippe Gustave Doulcet, le Comte de Pontécoulant.

Satellite craters
By convention these features are identified on lunar maps by placing the letter on the side of the crater midpoint that is closest to Pontécoulant.

References

 
 
 
 
 
 
 
 
 
 
 
 

Impact craters on the Moon